Polygonum parryi is a species of flowering plant in the knotweed family known by the common names Parry's knotweed and prickly knotweed. It is native to the western United States from Washington to California, where it grows in several types of moist, open habitat in mountainous and coastal areas.

Description
Polygonum parryi is a small annual herb forming mats or cushions of short, angled stems growing erect up to 7 or 8 centimeters (2.8–3.2 inches) in height. The greenish brown stems are lined densely and evenly with linear, spine-tipped leaves. The lowest leaves are longest, reaching up to 2 centimeters (0.8 inches) long, while leaves near the branch tips are small and scale-like. Each leaf has a thin, wide stipule which forms a fringed, fibrous ochrea around the base of the leaf. White flowers less than 2 millimeters (0.08 inches) wide occur in the leaf axils.

References

External links
Jepson Manual Treatment
Calphotos Photo gallery, University of California

parryi
Flora of the West Coast of the United States
Flora of California
Plants described in 1891
Taxa named by Edward Lee Greene
Flora without expected TNC conservation status